Katherine August-deWilde is an American business executive, board member, and philanthropist. She was the president of First Republic Bank from 2007 to 2015 and currently serves as its vice chair.

Early life and education
August-deWilde was born on February 13, 1948, in Bridgeport, Connecticut, to Edward Burstein and Benita Ruth Miller. She received her bachelor's degree in history from Goucher College in Towson, Maryland, and a Master of Business Administration (MBA) from the Stanford Graduate School of Business.

Career
From 1969 to 1973, August-deWilde held senior staff positions with various members of Congress. She was a consultant for McKinsey & Company from 1975 to 1978, working out of their offices in London and San Francisco. She was also the director of finance for Itel Corporation (now Anixter) from 1978 to 1979. In 1979, August-deWilde became treasurer of PMI Mortgage Insurance Company, later serving as senior vice president and Chief Financial Officer (CFO) from 1982 to 1985.

In 1985, August-deWilde became one of the early leaders of First Republic, a San Francisco-based bi-coastal bank and wealth management company offering personal banking, business banking, and trust and wealth management services.  August-deWilde joined First Republic as its chief financial officer in 1985 and co-led the bank for 30 years, serving as chief operating officer from 1996 to 2014 and president and COO from 2007 to 2015. In 2016, she became its vice chair.

In 2010, three years after Merrill Lynch purchased First Republic and two years after Bank of America acquired Merrill Lynch, August-deWilde, as president and COO, helped orchestrate a management buy-back with private equity partners.

Board memberships

August-deWilde has served as a member of several boards and councils, including the Advisory Council of the Stanford Graduate School of Business, the Advisory Council of the Stanford Center on Longevity, Catalyst Corporate Board Resource, the Committee of 200, Equilar and TriNet. She previously served as vice-chair of the Town School for Boys and as a trustee of the Boys and Girls Clubs of San Francisco and the Carnegie Foundation for the Advancement of Teaching. She was a member of the policy advisory board of the Center for Real Estate and Urban Economics, University of California, Berkeley. August-deWilde currently serves on the boards of Sunrun, OpenGov, Eventbrite, Tipping Point Community and the San Francisco Housing Accelerator Fund. She was a 2018 fellow in the Stanford Distinguished Careers Institute cohort.

Philanthropy 

August-deWilde is an angel investor with the women's investment group Broadway Angels and has been on the board of the Clayman Institute for Gender Research at Stanford University. In 2008, she and her husband founded the Katherine and David deWilde Faculty/Scholar fund to support work on entrepreneurship in developing economies. She and her husband previously seeded a professorship that year at the Stanford Graduate School of Business in honor of Professor George Parker. In 2012, they established the LGBT Summer Fellowship at University of Virginia School of Law to support outstanding law students working on legal matters of national and cultural importance to the lesbian, gay, bisexual, and transgender community. In 2015 they created the Katherine and David deWilde Endowed and Expendable Funds for Women's Achievement.

Personal life

August-deWilde lives in San Francisco with her husband, David deWilde, a lawyer and investor. She has four children. In 2021, she listed her modern farmhouse located in Sonoma for $7 million.

Honors

 1985, Working Woman, “The Breakthrough Generation: 73 Women Ready to Run Corporate America”
 2003, 2005, 2006, San Francisco Business Times, “Most Influential Women in Bay Area Business”
 2008, Legal Momentum, Women of Achievement Award
 2008 - 2013, San Francisco Business Times, “Most Influential Women in Bay Area Business”
 2012, Women's Initiative for Self-Employment, Founder's Award
 2012, Directors & Boards, “Directors to Watch”
 2015, Private Asset Management, “50 Most Influential Women in Private Wealth”
 2018, Stanford Graduate School of Business, "Excellence in Leadership Award"
2019, Most Influential Corporate Board Directors, WomenInc.
2020, Legendary Women of Heart, American Heart Association

References

Living people
Goucher College alumni
Stanford Graduate School of Business alumni
American women philanthropists
American women business executives
1948 births
Bank presidents and chief executive officers
21st-century American women